The Glamorgan Monmouth and Brecon Gazette and Merthyr Guardian was a weekly English-language local newspaper that circulated in Breconshire, Glamorganshire, and Monmouthshire.

Welsh Newspapers Online has digitised 493 issues of the Glamorgan Monmouth and Brecon Gazette and Merthyr Guardian (1832-1843) from the newspaper holdings of the National Library of Wales.

References

Newspapers published in Wales